Louis V. Iasiello, OFM, USN (born 6 September 1950) is a Catholic priest retired US Navy officer who served as the 23rd Chief of Chaplains of the United States Navy from 2003 to 2006. 

He is a well known Just War theorist, For 18 months after his retirement from the Navy, he was the president of Washington Theological Union. He accepted a position as a Professor of Humanities at Pontifical College Josephinum in Columbus, Ohio, in 2010.

Background and education
Iasiello grew up in Staten Island, New York. He is an alumnus of St. Bonaventure University (1972), with a bachelor's degree in History. He has earned graduate degrees from Niagara University (Education) (1973), the Washington Theological Union (Divinity) (1977), the Naval War College (National Security and Strategic Studies) (1991), Salve Regina College (International Relations) (1992), and a PhD from Salve Regina University (2003). His doctoral thesis was titled Jus in bello: Key issues for a contemporary assessment of just behavior in war.

Career
Iasiello was received into the Order of Friars Minor in August 1973 and is a member of the Franciscan Friars of Holy Name Province. After his ordination as a deacon, he worked in Anapolis, Brazil. He was ordained to the priesthood on 13 May 1978, and was assigned to a Franciscan parish serving the Hispanic community in the Bronx. He then became the head of the Modern Languages department at Bishop Timon High School in Buffalo, New York.

Military and Post-military Career
Iasiello was commissioned as a Navy Chaplain Lieutenant (Junior Grade) in the Naval Reserves in 1981 and was recalled to active duty July 1983. His active duty assignments include: Naval Air Station, Memphis (83–85); U.S. Coast Guard, Kodiak, Alaska (85–86); USS Ranger (CV-61) deployed in Operation Earnest Will, and in other deployments to Korea and the Persian Gulf (86–87); Second Marine Division; (8th Marine Regiment, 2nd Marine Regiment, Marine Forces Panama) including two deployments to Norway, Operation Just Cause, Panama, and with the 26th Marine Expeditionary Unit, Special Operations Capable (MEU SOC) (87–90). Other assignments include: Naval War College Command and Staff, distinguished military graduate (90–91); United States Naval Academy, staff and faculty (91–94); Joint Task Force 160 (Cuba and Haiti); Armed Forces Staff College (94); Assistant Fleet Chaplain, U.S. Atlantic Fleet and Deputy Chaplain, U.S. Atlantic Command (94–97); Director for Operational Ministry, Atlantic Fleet (97–98); and Director, Naval Chaplains School (98-00). After selection to flag rank, Iasiello became the first Chaplain Corps flag officer to be appointed Chaplain of the United States Marine Corps (00-03). He has served on a Defense Task Force and has lectured at a number of the military's war and staff colleges. The Senate confirmed his appointment as the 23rd Chief of Navy Chaplains, July 2003. He retired October 2006 and assumed the duties of President of the Washington Theological Union. Admiral Iasiello then served as co-chair of the Defense Task Force on Sexual Assault in the Military Services from 2008 through 2010. He has served on numerous boards and advisory councils, including the Board of Advisors of the Institute on Religion and Public Policy. He is currently on the board of the Franciscan Monastery of the HolyLand, Washington, DC. Since 2010, he has been a Professor of Humanities and Director of Human Formation at the Pontifical College Josephinum, Columbus, Ohio.

Personal decorations include the Legion of Merit (Gold Star in lieu of second award), the Defense Meritorious Service Medal, the Meritorious Service Medal (three awards); Navy/Marine Corps Commendation Medal (two awards), Coast Guard Commendation Medal; Navy and Marine Corps Achievement Medal; the Combat Action Ribbon and numerous other unit and service citations and awards.

In 1999, as a Navy Chaplain, Iasiello assisted at the burials at sea of John F. Kennedy, Jr., his wife, Carolyn Bessette, and her sister, Lauren Bessette.

Publications
Iasiello has been published in numerous periodicals and books, most recently in the Naval War College Review (Summer/Fall 04): Jus Post Bellum: Moral Obligations of the Victors of War.; "Betrayal of Trust: David and Bathsheba Revisited." New Theology Review Volume 21, Number 2, May 2008.

References

External links

1950 births
Living people
St. Bonaventure University alumni
Niagara University alumni
American Friars Minor
Washington Theological Union alumni
American Roman Catholic priests
Military personnel from New York City
Chaplains of the United States Marine Corps
Naval War College alumni
Salve Regina University alumni
United States Navy admirals
Chiefs of Chaplains of the United States Navy
Recipients of the Legion of Merit
Pontifical College Josephinum faculty